Burgasbus is the public transit service of the city of Burgas, Bulgaria. It serves the majority of bus routes in Municipality of Burgas (nearly 92%). It also runs to Varna, Yambol, Ruse and Elhovo.

Burgasbus operates both diesel buses and the Burgas trolleybus system. Over 850 employees work for the company.

History
In 2007, soon after its coming into power, the new management of Municipality of Burgas started subsidizing Burgasbus, so that the company could afford to buy new and comfortable buses and trolleybuses. By now the firm possesses around 200 buses and 20 trolley buses, but still the majority of them are amortized.

An important contribution to renewing the rolling stock has the former mayor of Burgas Mr. Ioan Kostadinov. In 1996 a great purchase was made with 30 brand-new Chavdar buses, made in Bulgaria. In 2005 12 recycled buses were bought. In 2008 another substantial renewing of the rolling stock took place when over 20 recycled buses, 10 recycled trolley buses and 10 brand-new Tedom buses were bought.

Bus stations
The two bus stations in the town are a property of Burgasbus as well. South bus station is situated on the Bulair Blvd. near the railway station and West bus station is situated in the north industrial district next to Billa hypermarket.

Ticketing
In the vehicles of the firm passengers are charged immediately after their boarding by a conductor.  Due to the town council of Burgas, Burgasbus offers low-cost season tickets for pupils and students, currently studying, and pensioners (above 65 or 70 years old).

Urban bus fleet 
MAN SG, MAN NG, MAN NL, Mercedes-Benz O405G, Mercedes-Benz O345 Conecto, Mercedes-Benz O405N, NEOPLAN N4015, Setra SG219, TEDOM C 12G, Solaris Urbino 12, Solaris Urbino 18.
Chavdar 120 buses have become the badge of Burgas transport. The only ones 20 manufactured pieces are owned by Burgasbus.

Decommissioned 
Chavdar 141, Chavdar 120, Chavdar 11Г5, Chavdar 11М4, Chavdar В13-20, Chavdar B14-20, Ikarus 280.03, Ikarus 280.02, Ikarus 260, Ikarus 280.04, DAF SB201 / Hainje, NEOPLAN N4021NF, Neoplan N116 Cityliner, MAN SG262, NEOPLAN N4016, Setra SG221ÜL.

See also

Burgas Central railway station
Trolleybuses in Burgas

External links

 Burgasbus – official site 
 Municipality of Burgas transport information page 

Bus transport in Bulgaria
Transport in Burgas